"Part-Time Love" is a song written by English musician Elton John with lyrics by Gary Osborne. It is the sixth track off his 1978 album, A Single Man. It is also the opening track of side two. It proved to be one of the most popular singles the pair wrote, along with 1982's "Blue Eyes" and the 1980 US million seller "Little Jeannie". It was banned in the Soviet release of the album along with another song, "Big Dipper". The single reached No. 15 in the UK and peaked just outside the Top 20 in the US at No. 21.

Lyrical meaning
In the 29 September 1979 edition of the Ann Landers advice column, one writer going by the title "Want A Better Environment For Our Youth" alleged that these lyrics of this song dealt with adultery: "You've been seen running around...Don't tell me what to do when you've been doing it too."

Release
While the lyrics on the A-side were written by Gary Osborne, those on the B-side, "I Cry at Night", were written by Bernie Taupin. It is one of the few singles John released with different lyricists on each side.

The song appeared on his compilation The Very Best of Elton John in 1990 and the deluxe edition of his 2017 compilation Diamonds.

Reception
Cash Box praised the "Fine singing, rhythm textures, big chorus, perky beat and nice arrangement." Record World called it a "solid pop/rock offering with a bouncy beat and full vocal hook."

Chart performance

Weekly charts

Year-end charts

Personnel
Elton John - piano, vocals
Tim Renwick - guitars
Clive Franks - bass
Steve Holley - drums
Ray Cooper - percussion
Vicki Brown - backing vocals
Joanne Stone – backing vocals
Stevie Lange – backing vocals
Gary Osborne – backing vocals
Chris Thompson – backing vocals
Davey Johnstone – backing vocals, lead guitar
Paul Buckmaster – orchestral arrangement

References

1978 singles
Elton John songs
Songs with music by Elton John
Songs with lyrics by Gary Osborne
1978 songs
The Rocket Record Company singles
MCA Records singles
Songs about infidelity